The 75th Indian Infantry Brigade was an Infantry formation of the Indian Army during World War II. It was formed in April 1942. In August 1944, it was renamed the Gardaí Brigade. It remained in India throughout the war and was disbanded in August 1945.

It was assigned in succession to:
15-Oct-1942 ?	14-Apr-1943 	HQ Peshawar District	
15-Apr-1943 ?	14-Aug-1944 	HQ Kohat District

Both of these districts were part of Northern Command.

Composition

75th Brigade
2nd Punjab Regiment]]  April 194 to July 1943
14th Battalion, 14th Punjab Regiment April 1942 to August 1943 and  February 1944 to August 1944
14th Battalion, 1st Punjab Regiment April 1942 to August 1944
9th Battalion, 19th Hyderabad Regiment November 1942  to August 1943
9th Battalion, 10th Baluch Regiment April 1943 to March 1944
16th Battalion, 5th Mahratta Light Infantry March 1944 to August 1944

Gardaí Brigade
14th Battalion, 1st Punjab Regiment August 1944 to October 1944
1st Battalion, Mahar Regiment October 1944 to March 1945
8th Battalion, 10th Baluch Regiment October 1944 to August 1945
15th Battalion, 7th Rajput Regiment October 1944 to August 1945
6th Battalion, 11th Sikh Regiment November 1944 to August 1945
9th Battalion, 9th Jat Regiment February 1945 to August 1945	
8th Battalion, 9th Jat Regiment June 1945 to August 1945

See also

 List of Indian Army Brigades in World War II

References

Brigades of India in World War II
British Indian Army brigades